Falsogastrallus is a genus of beetles in the family Ptinidae. There are at least three described species in Falsogastrallus.

Species
These three species belong to the genus Falsogastrallus:
 Falsogastrallus librinocens (Fisher, 1938) i c g
 Falsogastrallus sauteri Pic, 1914 g
 Falsogastrallus unistriatus (Zoufal, 1897) g
Data sources: i = ITIS, c = Catalogue of Life, g = GBIF, b = Bugguide.net

References

Further reading

 
 
 
 
 

Ptinidae